Pehr Osbeck (1723 – 23 December 1805) was a Swedish explorer, naturalist and an apostle of Carl Linnaeus. He was born in the parish of Hålanda on  Västergötland and studied at Uppsala with Carolus Linnaeus.

Naturalist in Canton
In 1750–1752 he travelled as chaplain on the ship Prins Carl to Asia where he spent four months studying the flora, fauna, and people of the Canton region of China. He returned home just in time to contribute more than 600 species of plant to Linnaeus' Species Plantarum, published in 1753.

In 1757 he published the journal of his voyage to China, Dagbok öfwer en ostindisk Resa åren 1750, 1751, 1752, which was translated into German in 1762 and English in 1771. In 1758, he was elected a member of the Royal Swedish Academy of Sciences.

Later career
He ended his career as the parish priest of Våxtorp and Hasslöv in Halland, where he died in 1805.

Collections
His large collections are preserved in Sweden and the UK. He is commemorated by the genus Osbeckia L. of plants in the family Melastomataceae.

Selected works

 Osbeck, Pehr (1771). A voyage to China and East Indies, Vol. I.   London: Benjamin White. [digitized by University of Hong Kong Libraries, Digital Initiatives, "China Through Western Eyes." ]
 Osbeck, Pehr (1771). A voyage to China and East Indies, Vol. II.   London: Benjamin White. [digitized by University of Hong Kong Libraries, Digital Initiatives, "China Through Western Eyes." ]

References 

1723 births
1805 deaths
People from Ale Municipality
Swedish naturalists
Members of the Royal Swedish Academy of Sciences
Age of Liberty people